The Jomard Channel, also known as the Jomard Entrance or Jomard Passage, is a navigable strait in the Milne Bay Province of Papua New Guinea between the Louisiade Archipelago and New Guinea.  The channel lies between the Jomard Islands and Duperré Islets/Bramble Haven and connects the Solomon Sea with the Coral Sea.

History 
In 1942 a part of the navy of the Japanese Empire used the Jomard Channel to enter the Coral Sea in order to invade the Papuan capital Port Moresby. The Battle of the Coral Sea preempted the invasion.

References
 
 Encarta World Atlas view of the Jomard Entrance

Straits of Papua New Guinea